Chuck Berry Twist is the first compilation album by Chuck Berry, released by Chess Records in February 1962, during Berry's imprisonment. The title was an attempt to capitalize on a new dance craze, the Twist, introduced by Chubby Checker in 1960, even though none of the songs musically conformed to the Twist style (most of the songs predated the introduction of the dance). The album was reissued a year later with a new title, More Chuck Berry. An album with that title was released in the UK by Pye International Records in 1964, featuring the same cover but a completely different track listing.

Critical reception 
In a 1978 poll of music critics, Robert Christgau listed the record as the fourth best rock album of all time.

The record was reviewed by Pig River Records on its 50th anniversary in February 2012, receiving a score of 9.0/10.

Track listing 
All songs written by Chuck Berry except as noted

US versions 
Side One
 "Maybellene"
 "Roll Over Beethoven"
 "Oh Baby Doll"
 "Around and Around"
 "Come On"
 "Let It Rock"
 "Reelin' and Rockin'"
Side Two
 "School Days"
 "Almost Grown"
 "Sweet Little Sixteen"
 "Thirty Days"
 "Johnny B. Goode"
 "Rock and Roll Music"
 "Back in the U.S.A."

UK version 
This is the UK Track listing for the album More Chuck Berry.  There is no UK version of the iteration of the album titled "Twist."

Side One
 "Sweet Little Rock & Roller"
 "Anthony Boy"
 "Little Queenie"
 "Worried Life Blues" (Big Maceo Merriweather)
 "Carol"
 "Reelin' & Rockin'"
Side Two
 "Thirty Days"
 "Brown Eyed Handsome Man"
 "Too Much Monkey Business"
 "Wee Wee Hours"
 "Jo Jo Gunne"
 "Beautiful Delilah"

Personnel 
 Chuck Berry –  vocals, guitar
 Willie Dixon –  bass
 Johnnie Johnson –  piano
 Jasper Thomas –  drums
 Ebby Hardy –  drums
 Jerome Green –  maracas
 Otis Spann –  piano
 J. C. Davis –  tenor saxophone
 Fred Below –  drums
 Lafayette Leake –  piano
 George Smith –  bass
 Etta James –  backing vocals
 The Marquees –  backing vocals
 Martha Berry –  backing vocals

References 

Chuck Berry compilation albums
1962 compilation albums
Chess Records compilation albums
Albums produced by Leonard Chess
Albums produced by Phil Chess